Grays Point is an unincorporated community in Lawrence County, in the U.S. state of Missouri.

History
A post office called Gray's Point was established in 1866, and remained in operation until 1905. The community was named after the original owner of the site.

References

Unincorporated communities in Lawrence County, Missouri
Unincorporated communities in Missouri